Charles Lepeintre (1735–1803) was a French painter. His grandson was the painter Charles-Philippe Larivière.

References

External links
http://www.artnet.com/artist/671648/charles-lepeintre.html

1730s births
1803 deaths
18th-century French painters
French male painters
18th-century French male artists